Michael Edward Luckovich (born January 28, 1960) is a liberal editorial cartoonist who has worked for The Atlanta Journal-Constitution since 1989. He is the 2005 winner of the Reuben, the National Cartoonists Society's top award for cartoonist of the year, and is the recipient of two Pulitzer Prizes.

Early life
Luckovich was born in Seattle, Washington, attended Bishop Kelly High School in Boise, Idaho, before transferring to Sheldon High School in Eugene, Oregon, and graduated in 1982 from the University of Washington with a degree in political science. While a student at UW, he was "one of two non-Jewish members of ZBT frat" on the campus. For two years after graduation, he sold cartoons on a freelance basis to the Everett, Washington, newspaper while working as an insurance salesman.

Career

Luckovich began his career with The Greenville News (South Carolina) in 1984 and moved to the New Orleans Times-Picayune later that year. In 1989 he began his career with the Atlanta Journal-Constitution, which continues to today. In 2000, Luckovich started his comic strip "SuperZeros" about a pair of dim-witted superheroes. It was distributed by Tribune Media Service and lasted a year.

In a September 2001 interview, Luckovich commented on his style of cartooning and how it changed after the 9/11 terrorist attacks:
Normally with my cartoons I try to use humor to get across my point. After Sept. 11th, you just couldn't use humor. The tragedy was so enormous, you couldn't be funny. It's almost like you have to come up with cartoons using a different part of your brain. I was just trying to come up with images that expressed the emotions that I was feeling and tried to focus in on different aspects of the tragedy that I thought were important. In the same interview Luckovich cited Jeff MacNelly as his "biggest editorial cartoonist role model" and Mort Drucker as his "first hero".

Awards
While at the Atlanta Journal-Constitution, Mike Luckovich won several awards. He won the 1995 Pulitzer Prize and 2006 Pulitzer Prize for Editorial Cartooning. He received the National Cartoonists Society Editorial Cartoon Award for 2001, with additional nominations for 1998 and 2002. He won the 2008 National Journalism Awards, for Editorial Cartooning. In 2018, he received the Advancing American Democracy Award by the Benjamin Harrison Presidential Site.

Controversy
Luckovich attracted a great deal of backlash when the newspaper cartoonist drew a cartoon depicting Michael Jackson's death one day after his death. The comic strip illustrated the leaders Heaven and Hell flipping a coin to see where the late King of Pop would be after his demise. Many people, including Jackson's family, friends, and fans deemed the cartoon offensive.

On December 3, 2019, Luckovich posted a cartoon on Twitter depicting Facebook founder Mark Zuckerberg defending racists, lying politicians, Nazis, and Russians. Some interpreted this as comparing Russians to Nazis and the KKK, while others noted Luckovich was simply referring to widespread criticism of Facebook for not having done enough to stop Russian Internet troll farms from using Facebook to interfere in US politics, including the 2016 presidential elections.

Books
 Lotsa Luckovich (Pocket, 1996) 
 Four More Wars! (ECW Press, 2006) 
 A Very Stable Genius! (ECW Press, 2018)

References

External links
 Mike Luckovich blog at the Atlanta Journal-Constitution website
 
 2006 biography from the Pulitzer Prize website
 Drawing Attention, a September 1995 article from Columns Magazine, hosted on the University of Washington website
 Bio in New Georgia Encyclopedia
 2001 interview from JournalismJobs.com, a website "operated in partnership with Columbia Journalism Review"
 NCS Awards

American editorial cartoonists
Pulitzer Prize for Editorial Cartooning winners
University of Washington College of Arts and Sciences alumni
The Atlanta Journal-Constitution people
1960 births
Living people
Artists from Seattle
Reuben Award winners
Sheldon High School (Eugene, Oregon) alumni